The 2003 FIBA Africa Club Championship for Women was the 10th FIBA Africa Women's Clubs Champions Cup, an international basketball tournament held in Maputo, Mozambique, from October 29 to November 4, 2003. The tournament, organized by FIBA Africa and hosted by Maxaquene, was contested by 6 clubs in a round-robin system.

First Bank ended the round-robin tournament with a 5–0 unbeaten record to win their first title and qualify for the 2004 FIBA Women's World League.

Participating teams

Schedule

Day 1

Day 2

Day 3

Day 4

Day 5

Final standings 

First Bank rosterAisha Mohammed, Barbara Diribe, Ezinne James, Funmilayo Ojelabi, Joy Okoka, Mactabene Amachree, Mfon Udoka, Nguveren Iyorhe, Patricia Chukwuma, Perpetua Clement, Stella Ofurum, Coach: Ganiyu Otenigbagbe

Awards

References

FIBA Africa Women's Clubs Champions Cup
2003 in African basketball
2003 in women's basketball
FIBA
International women's basketball competitions hosted by Mozambique